The 2012 Oceania Women's Sevens Championship was the second edition of the Oceania Women's Sevens Championship and also doubled as a qualifier for the 2013 Rugby World Cup Sevens. It was held from 3–4 August 2012 in Churchill Park, Lautoka, Fiji. Since Australia and New Zealand had already qualified for the World Cup. Fiji as the other highest placing team qualified for the Asia/Oceania final qualifier in Pune, India.

Tournament

Pool Stages 
Pool 1

Pool 2

Finals 
Plate

Cup

References 

2012
2012 rugby sevens competitions
2012 in women's rugby union